Kintnersville is an unincorporated community in Bucks County, Pennsylvania, United States. As of 2019, its population was 2,881. 

Its latitude is 40.557 degrees north and its longitude is 75.18 degrees east. The community is located near state routes 32 and 611, and the Delaware River.

Education
Palisades High School is located in the community.

References

Unincorporated communities in Bucks County, Pennsylvania
Unincorporated communities in Pennsylvania